Scene.org (also known as The International Scene Organization) is a non-profit organization, providing the currently largest demoscene file repository. It was founded in 1996 by Jaakko "Mellow-D" Manninen, though originally it existed as ftp.fm.org, an FTP-server for releases from the group Five Musicians.  In 1997, it re-opened as Scene.org.  After the Hornet Archive closed on September 22, 1998, scene.org became the only prominent demoscene-FTP available and quickly became the host of many other releases as well.

The Scene.org servers are hosted in Rotterdam, at the local university. They measure 150-200 GB of traffic each day (as of May 2006) and host about 1.1 TB of demoscene-related data (as of June 2013). The main server is mirrored onto various others, residing in different countries. It is currently sponsored by, among others, Pixar.

Awards

In 2003, Scene.org established the Scene.org Awards, given annually to the creators of the best demos or intros that year. The winners (except for the Public's Choice category) were selected by a jury, consisting of acclaimed sceners from all around the globe. The awarding ceremony was traditionally held at the Breakpoint demo party., however on the first of September 2010, it was announced that the 2011 award would be held at The Gathering. The Scene.org Awards project however ended at Assembly in 2012.

Categories 
The awards hosted the following categories:
 Best Demo
 Best 64K Intro
 Best 4K Intro (from 2004)
 Best Effects
 Best Graphics
 Best Soundtrack
 Best Direction
 Most Original Concept
 Breakthrough Performance
 Best Technical Achievement (from 2009)
 Public's Choice (from 2004)
 Best Demo on an Oldschool Platform (from 2005)

Winners and nominations
Note: The year signifies the release year of the products - the ceremony is always held during the following year.

keWlers and Moppi are tied for the most awards won with four each. The most nominated firm is keWlers with 19 total nominations. mfx is the only group with at least one nomination in every year, as of 2006.

Planet Risk and Lifeforce, both by Andromeda Software Development, are the only demos so far that have won the Best Demo and Public's Choice at the same time.

2006

Best Demo
 Track One by Fairlight
 Deities by mfx
 Five Finger Discount by Shitfaced Clowns
 STS-02: Electric Kool-Aid by Synesthetics
 Starstruck by The Black Lotus

Best 64k Intro
 Chaos Theory by Conspiracy
 Memento by Conspiracy
 Dead Ringer by Fairlight
 Meet The Family by Fairlight
 Aesterozoa by Kewlers

Best 4k Intro
 Glitterati by Fairlight
 Parazonantikum by Calodox
 Polarfield by Fuzzion
 miChinygma by Limp Ninja
 Artefacts by Plush

Best Animation
 Unclear Throat by Pluisje
 Surprise (Egon and Dönci - Last man on Earth!?) by Aenima
 Lloco by Exceed
 Of Mice and Monsters by Junk
 The Tits Have Escaped by Pluisje

Best Demo on an Oldskool Platform
 Error 23 by Resource & The Dreams
 Old Skool Invitro Maker - Sundown 06 Invite by Ate Bit
 Trans*Form by Focus
 The Wild Bunch by Instinct, Triad, Horizon & Focus
 Artefacts by Plush

Best Effects
 The Evolution of Vision by Andromeda Software Development
 Track One by Fairlight
 Liquid Lust by Fairlight
 Deities by MFX
 Five Finger Discount by Shitfaced Clowns

Best Graphics
 Starstruck by The Black Lotus
 Project 2501 by ADDiCT
 Lux Aeterna Luceat Eis by Ephidrena
 Track One by Fairlight
 FR-049: Of Spirits Taken by Farbrausch & Vacuum

Best Soundtrack
 1995 by Kewlers & MFX
 Animal Attraction by Andromeda Software Development
 Track One by Fairlight
 Deities by MFX
 Starstruck by The Black Lotus

Best Direction
 Starstruck by The Black Lotus
 Chaos Theory by Conspiracy
 Track One by Fairlight
 Deities by MFX
 Die Ewigkeit Schmerzt by Neuro

Most Original Concept
 Old Skool Invitro Maker - Sundown 06 Invite by Ate Bit
 The Evolution of Vision by Andromeda Software Development
 Captive by Andromeda Software Development
 Trans*Form by Focus
 Die Ewigkeit Schmerzt by Neuro

Breakthrough Performance
 Iterate by Imbusy & Xerxes
 Balance by Adapt
 Solaris - Kiss Our ASSembler by Brainstorm
 Led Blur by Mindlapse
 Remembrance - The Dolphin's Dream by Vovoid

Public's Choice
 1995 by Kewlers & MFX
 Animal Attraction by Andromeda Software Development
 Chaos Theory by Conspiracy
 Derealization by Dead Hackers Society
 Starstruck by The Black Lotus

2005

Best Demo
 Aether by mfx
 Final Audition by Plastic
 Iconoclast by Andromeda Software Development
 Ocean Machine by The Black Lotus
 STS-04: Instant Zen by Synesthetics

Best 64k Intro
 Che Guevara by Fairlight
 Binary Flow - the Assembly'05 invitation by Conspiracy
 Death and Taxes by Fairlight
 Fiat Homo by Traction
 Memories from the MCP by Brain Control

Best 4k Intro
 Parsec by Frenetic & r0K
 Anorgatronikum by Calodox
 Noxie by Loonies
 Panoptriptikum by Calodox
 Synchroplastikum by Calodox

Best Effects
 Aether by mfx
 I'am the seed by CyberPunks Unity and Inward
 Iconoclast by Andromeda Software Development
 Newton never did this, BITCH by Shitfaced Clowns
 STS-04: Instant Zen by Synesthetics

Best Graphics
 Ocean Machine by The Black Lotus
 Don't stop by Portal Process
 Final Audition by Plastic
 Perfect Love by LKCC and Bauknecht

Best Soundtrack
 Ocean Machine by The Black Lotus
 Aether by mfx
 Fair Play to the Queen by Candela
 Iconoclast by Andromeda Software Development
 STS-04: Instant Zen by Synesthetics

Best Direction
 Poison Ivy by Exceed
 Che Guevara by Fairlight
 Fairplay to the Queen by Candela
 Iconoclast by Andromeda Software Development
 Perfect Love by LKCC and Bauknecht

Most Original Concept
 The Ballet Dancer by mfx
 Antifact by Limp Ninja
 Barn by The Digital Artists
 Bugtro by Mostly Harmless
 Hello:Friend by Fairlight

Breakthrough Performance
 Fairplay to the Queen by Candela
 Memories from the MCP by Brain Control
 SHizZLE by Team Pokeme
 Tannhauser Gate by Cubicle
 Trocken by Bauknecht

Best Demo on an Oldskool Platform
 Boogie Factor by Fairlight
 Hello:Friend by Fairlight
 I'am the seed by CyberPunks Unity and Inward
 One Million Lightyears From Earth by Fairlight
 The Throckmorton Device by Triad

Public's Choice
 Iconoclast by Andromeda Software Development
 Aether by mfx
 Final Audition by Plastic
 Ocean Machine by The Black Lotus
 STS-04: Instant Zen by Synesthetics

2004

Best demo
 Planet Risk by Andromeda Software Development
 Coma (on the dance floor) by Cocoon
 We Cell by keWlers
 X-MIX 2004 by mfx and keWlers
 Arise by Stravaganza
 Silkcut by The Black Lotus

Best 64k intro
  The Prophecy - Project Nemesis by Conspiracy
 Beyond by Conspiracy
 Kings of the Playground - Evoke 2004 Invitation by Equinox
 Fresh! by Fairlight
 Paradise by rgba

Best 4k intro
 Micropolis by TBC and Mainloop
 Feet4 by AND
 San Angeles Observation by Armada
 Finnmark by Ephidrena
 Ex Fabric by Frenetic and KB

Best effects
 47'111.0 by Faktory
 Planet Risk by Andromeda Software Development
 We Cell by keWlers
 Assembly 2004 Invitation by Moppi Productions
 Arise by Stravaganza

Best graphics
 Your Fingers So Gently On My Skin by Plastic
 Interceptor by Black Maiden
 Coma (on the dance floor) by Cocoon
 Arise by Stravaganza
 Silkcut by The Black Lotus

Best soundtrack
 Coma (on the dance floor) by Cocoon
 Planet Risk by Andromeda Software Development
 We Cell by keWlers
 X-MIX 2004 by mfx and keWlers
 Assembly 2004 Invitation by Moppi Productions

Best direction
 Amondo by Aenima
 Interceptor by Black Maiden
 Kings of the Playground - Evoke 2004 Invitation by Equinox
 Assembly 2004 Invitation by Moppi Productions
 Arise by Stravaganza
 Silkcut by The Black Lotus

Most original concept
 Assembly 2004 Invitation by Moppi Productions
 Panjabmoore Meets 007 Again by Calodox
 8088 Corruption by Hornet
 X-MIX 2004 by mfx and keWlers
 Traction by Traction

Breakthrough performance
 Syntonic Dentiforms by Nesnausk
 Michera by Limp Ninja
 Synthematik by Outracks
 Glowsick by Portal Process
 I am by Traction

Public's choice
 Planet Risk by Andromeda Software Development
 The Prophecy - Project Nemesis by Conspiracy
 Kings of the Playground - Evoke 2004 Invitation by Equinox
 We Cell by keWlers
 Silkcut by The Black Lotus

2003

Best Demo
 IX by Moppi Productions
 Doomsday by Complex
 fr-025: The Popular Demo by Farbrausch
 Protozoa by keWlers
 A Significant Deformation Near the Cranium by keWlers

Best 64k Intro
 fr-030: Candytron by Farbrausch
 Zoom3 by AND and Cybermag
 Project Genesis by Conspiracy
 fr-034 / HJB-104: Time Index by Farbrausch and Haujobb
 Point Blank by Stockholm Syndrome

Best 4k Intro
 Yellow Rose of Texas by Fit and Bandwagon
 Acid Ice by AND
 Sponge by Freestyle
 Mojo Dreams by Frenetic and r0K
 Robotic Warrior by PWP

Best Effects
 Aura for Laura by Soopadoopa
 Zoom3 by AND and Cybermag
 Doomsday by Complex
 fr-025: The Popular Demo by Farbrausch
 A Significant Deformation Near the Cranium by keWlers

Best Graphics
 Relais by Kolor
 fr-031: Faded Memories by Farbrausch
 A Significant Deformation Near the Cranium by keWlers
 Grafikal Jihad by Mankind
 IX by Moppi Productions

Best Soundtrack
 A Significant Deformation Near the Cranium by keWlers
 Dreamchild by Andromeda Software Development
 fr-025: The Popular Demo by Farbrausch
 Protozoa by keWlers
 Pornonoise by Lunix and mfx

Best Direction
 IX by Moppi Productions
 A Place Called Universe by Conspiracy
 45 For Electricity Edit by Lunix
 I Feel Like A Computer by Melon Dezign
 Staying Pictures by TPOLM

Most original concept
 IX by Moppi Productions
 Heart Shaped Box by Haujobb
 Protozoa by keWlers
 I Feel Like A Computer by Melon Dezign
 Staying Pictures by TPOLM

Breakthrough Performance
 Project Genesis by Conspiracy
 Political Statement With a Well Hidden Message by Matt Current
 Die Anderung by Spontz
 Point Blank by Stockholm Syndrome
 Phloam by Unique

Public's choice
 fr-025: The Popular Demo by Farbrausch
 Zoom3 by AND and Cybermag
 Dreamchild by Andromeda Software Development
 Protozoa by keWlers
 IX by Moppi Productions

2002

Best Demo
 Variform by keWlers
 Raw Confessions by Cocoon
 Planet Loop by Madwizards and Nah-Kolor
 Halla by Moppi Productions
 Little Nell by The Black Lotus

Best Intro
 Planet Potion by Potion
 Squish by AND
 fr-019: Poem to a Horse by Farbrausch
 Gracchus by Kolor and Freestyle
 Salmiakki by TPOLM

Best Effects
 Variform by keWlers
 fr-019: Poem to a Horse by Farbrausch
 A Deepness In The Sky by mfx
 Planet Potion by Potion
 32 Degrees In The Shade by Yodel

Best Graphics
 Raw Confessions by Cocoon
 Liquid... Wen? by Haujobb
 Planet Loop by Madwizards and Nah-Kolor
 Halla by Moppi Productions
 Little Nell by The Black Lotus

Best Soundtrack
 Variform by keWlers
 Retrograde by Black Maiden
 Liquid... Wen? by Haujobb
 Planet Potion by Potion
 Little Nell by The Black Lotus

Best Direction
 Tom Thumb by TPOLM
 Visual Approach To The Aesthetics Of Techno by Neuro.Concept
 Variform by keWlers
 Halla by Moppi Productions
 Amour by Orion

Most original concept
 Easter Egg by Orion
 +1-1 by !=
 Superjam Superheroes by Mandarine
 fr-029: Dopplerdefekt by Farbrausch
 Chimera by Halcyon

Breakthrough Performance
 Squish by AND
 Petroleo by Boah
 Paradise Is Coming by rgba
 This Way by Stravaganza
 The S by Suspend

References

Bibliography

External links

Awards

Demoscene
Dutch websites
Internet properties established in 1996